Khanthaboury  is the old name of Savannakhet city, which since 2005 has been named Kaysone Phomvihane. It is a district (muang) of Savannakhet province in southern Laos.

References

Districts of Savannakhet province